Boston Brook Airport  is located  southwest of Boston Brook, New Brunswick, Canada.

References

External links
 Page about this aerodrome on COPA's Places to Fly airport directory

Registered aerodromes in New Brunswick
Transport in Victoria County, New Brunswick
Buildings and structures in Victoria County, New Brunswick